Mustafa Ferit Arsan (1876 - 9 October 1941) was a Turkish politician who represented Gaziantep in the 2nd and 3rd Parliaments of Turkey, and was the leader of the local Association for Defence of National Rights in Aintab, which organized the Turkish militias against the French siege.

References

1876 births
1941 deaths
Republican People's Party (Turkey) politicians
Deputies of Gaziantep
Turkish militia officers
Turkish military personnel of the Franco-Turkish War
Members of Kuva-yi Milliye
People from Gaziantep